The Tour de Selangor is an annual professional road bicycle racing stage race held in Malaysia since 2017. The race is part of the UCI Asia Tour and was classified by the International Cycling Union (UCI) as a 2.2 category race.

Past winners

References

Cycle races in Malaysia
UCI Asia Tour races
Recurring sporting events established in 2017
2017 establishments in Malaysia